Martín de Béjar (died 1530) was a Roman Catholic prelate who served as the third Bishop of Panamá (1527–1530).

Biography
A native of Seville, Martín de Béjar was ordained a priest in the Order of Friars Minor. In 1527, Pope Clement VII appointed him as the third Bishop of Panamá. While bishop, the seat of the diocese was transferred to Panama City on the Pacific coast. He served as Bishop until his death in 1530.

See also
Catholic Church in Panama

References

External links and additional sources
 (for Chronology of Bishops) 
 (for Chronology of Bishops) 

1530 deaths
Bishops appointed by Pope Clement VII
Franciscan bishops
16th-century Roman Catholic bishops in Panama
Roman Catholic bishops of Panamá